Pothrakonda is a village in Srikakulam district of the Indian state of Andhra Pradesh. It is located in Sompeta mandal .

Demographics
Pothrakonda village has population of 1,443 of which 728 are males while 715 are females as per Population 2011, Indian Census.

References

Villages in Srikakulam district